Penhaligon's is a British perfume house. It was founded in the late 1860s by William Henry Penhaligon, a Cornish barber who moved to London and who became Court Barber and Perfumer to Queen Victoria.

History 
Penhaligon's started life as a barber within the London and Provincial Turkish Baths, 76 Jermyn Street, an important homosocial space in the 'inner sanctum of the masculine city'. As was typical of barbers at the time, Penhaligon created his own products to sell to his clients, many of whom were politicians of the age. The first standalone shop was situated in Jermyn Street next to the street's Turkish bath, where William Penhaligon had been a barber. The second shop opened at 33 St James' Street, and was attached to the Jermyn Street store at the rear. In the late 1920s, the business moved to Bury Street. The original buildings were destroyed in The Blitz in 1941, but the store on Bury Street remained untouched. The Bury Street premises operated until the mid 1950s, when Penhaligon's was purchased by Geo F Trumper, continuing to be manufactured from the basement of Trumper's Curzon Street premises, and slowly fell into obscurity until the brand was revived and a shop opened in Wellington Street, Covent Garden in 1977.

Penhaligon's today is wholly owned by Spanish fashion and fragrance company Puig International SA.

Stores
Besides the flagship store in Covent Garden, locations in London include the Burlington Arcade, Canary Wharf, Regent Street, Mayfair, Kings Road, Islington, the Royal Exchange and a second Covent Garden store has opened. A store is also located within Bicester Village.

Other shops have also been established outside of the capital in Glasgow, Edinburgh, Cambridge, Leeds, and Chester, as well as internationally in Paris, New York City, Hong Kong, San Francisco, Singapore, Taiwan and Macau.

Products

 Hammam Bouquet - 1872; the company's first scent
 Blenheim Bouquet - 1902; the company's longest surviving bespoke fragrance, created for the Duke of Marlborough and named for Blenheim Palace
 English Fern - 1910
 Douro Eau de Portugal- 1911; name changed to Lords, reverted to Douro
 Lily of the Valley - 1976
 Violetta - 1976 - (no longer in production)
 Bluebell - 1978
 Victorian Posy - 1979 (No longer in production)
 Elisabethan Rose - 1984 (No longer in production)
 Racquets - 1989 (No longer in production)
 Cornubia - 1991
 Quercus - 1996
 Castile - 1998
 LP No.9 for ladies - 1998
 LP No.9 for men - 1999
 Artemisia - 2002; Was nominated for a FiFi Fragrance Foundation award in the Nouveau Niche category in 2002.
 Endymion - 2003
 Malabah - 2003
 Lavandula - 2004
 Ellenisia - 2005
 Opus 1870 - 2005; Created as a celebration of Penhaligon's heritage
 Lily & Spice - 2006 (No longer in production)
 Elixir - 2008 (No longer in production)
 Amaranthine - 2009 (No longer in production)
 Sartorial - 2010
 Juniper Sling - 2011
 Peoneve - 2012
 Vaara - 2013; Created for Maharajah Gaj Singh II
 Iris Prima - 2013; Created in collaboration with English National Ballet
 Bayolea - 2014; A modernised version of a bay rum tonic from Penhaligon's archives

Between July 2009 and 2011 Penhaligon's reissued a selection of perfumes from their archives under the banner of the Anthology Collection:

 Eau de Cologne - 1927 (No longer in production)
 Zizonia - 1930
 Eau de Verveine - 1949 (No longer in production)
 Extract of Limes - 1963 (No longer in production)
 Gardenia - 1976
 Night Scented Stock - 1976
 Orange Blossom - 1976
 Jubilee Bouquet - 1977 (No longer in production)
 Esprit du Roi - 1983
 Eau sans Pareil - 1988

In September 2014 Penhaligon's launched the Trade Routes collection, comprising four fragrances inspired by the explosion of trade in London at the end of the 19th Century:

 Empressa - 2014; Inspired by the silks and extravagant goods traded through London
 Lothair - 2014; Inspired by and named for the last and biggest Tea Clipper ship
 Levantium - 2014; Inspired by the goods stacked high on the wharves, described in a John Masefield poem
 As Sawira - 2015; Inspired by Essaouira, the first Sea Port in Morocco

In 2015 Penhaligon's launched two new fragrances inspired by the wilds of the British Coastline.

 Blasted Heath - 2015; Inspired by the power of the sea.
 Blasted Bloom - 2015; Inspired by the wild flora of the British Coastline.
 Equinox Bloom  - 2016; The first 2016 launch from Penhaligon's, Equinox Bloom is inspired by the loved British tradition of Afternoon Tea

References

External links

Luxury brands
Perfume houses
British Royal Warrant holders
1870 establishments in England
Manufacturing companies established in 1870
Retail companies established in 1870
British companies established in 1870